L'Association des Églises Missionnaire Baptiste Landmark du Québec (or the Landmark Missionary Baptist Association of Quebec) was a local association of French-speaking Landmark Missionary Baptists in Quebec.

In 2000, this association was composed of 4 churches with 201 members. These churches also affiliate with the Interstate & Foreign Landmark Missionary Baptist Association of America, based largely in the southern parts of Alabama, Louisiana, and Mississippi. In addition to these 4 churches, 6 other churches in Quebec participate in the Interstate & Foreign Association, and are in fellowship with the churches of l'Association des Églises Missionnaire Baptiste Landmark. This makes a total of 10 French-speaking Landmark Baptist churches in Quebec with 531 members.

L'Association des Églises Missionnaire Baptiste Landmark holds a general faith and practice in common with Landmark Missionary Baptists in the United States, and, like the Interstate & Foreign Association, believe pastoral support should be by free will offerings and observe the rite of feet washing.

Sources
Association minutes
L'Association des Églises Missionnaire Baptiste Landmark du Québec, 2000
Interstate & Foreign Landmark Missionary Baptist Association, 2000

Baptist denominations in North America
Baptist Christianity in Canada